Chelsie Giles (born 25 January 1997) is a British judoka. She won the gold medal in the women's 52 kg event at the 2022 European Judo Championships held in Sofia, Bulgaria. She won one of the bronze medals in her event at the 2020 Summer Olympics in Tokyo, Japan. Giles' medal was the first awarded to Great Britain at the 2020 Summer Olympics.

Career
Giles won the half-lightweight division at the British Judo Championships in 2014, 2015 and 2017. In 2017, she competed in the women's 52 kg event at the 2017 European Judo Championships held in Warsaw, Poland. A year later, she competed in the women's 52 kg event at the 2018 World Judo Championships held in Baku, Azerbaijan. She was eliminated in her second match by Charline Van Snick of Belgium.

At the 2018 Judo Grand Prix Antalya held in Antalya, Turkey, she won the silver medal in her event. She also won one of the bronze medals in the women's 52 kg event at the 2018 Judo Grand Prix Budapest held in Budapest, Hungary. She also won her first Grand Slam medal: one of the bronze medals at the 2018 Judo Grand Slam Abu Dhabi held in Abu Dhabi, United Arab Emirates.

In 2019, she competed in the women's 52 kg event at the World Judo Championships held in Tokyo, Japan. In 2021, she competed in the women's 52 kg event at the Judo World Masters held in Doha, Qatar. A month later, she won the gold medal in her event at the Judo Grand Slam Tel Aviv held in Tel Aviv, Israel. At the 2021 Judo Grand Slam Tbilisi held in Tbilisi, Georgia, she won the silver medal in her event. In June 2021, she competed in the women's 52 kg event at the World Judo Championships held in Budapest, Hungary where she was eliminated in her second match by eventual bronze medallist Fabienne Kocher of Switzerland.

At the 2020 Summer Olympics in Tokyo, Japan, she won the first medal of the competition for Team GB, winning one of the bronze medals in the women's 52 kg event. A few months later, she won the silver medal in her event at the 2021 Judo Grand Slam Baku held in Baku, Azerbaijan. At the 2021 Judo Grand Slam Abu Dhabi held in Abu Dhabi, United Arab Emirates, she won the silver medal in her event.

She won the gold medal in the women's 52 kg event at the 2022 European Judo Championships held in Sofia, Bulgaria. In the final, she defeated Amandine Buchard of France.

Major results
2019
 European Games, 52 kg, Minsk, Belarus
2021
 Summer Olympics, 52 kg, Tokyo, Japan
2022
 European Championships, 52 kg, Sofia, Bulgaria
 World Championships, 52 kg, Tashkent, Uzbekistan

References

External links
 

Living people
1997 births
Sportspeople from Coventry
British female judoka
Judoka at the 2019 European Games
European Games medalists in judo
European Games bronze medalists for Great Britain
Olympic judoka of Great Britain
Judoka at the 2020 Summer Olympics
Olympic medalists in judo
Olympic bronze medallists for Great Britain
Medalists at the 2020 Summer Olympics
21st-century British women